The Corydon Battle Site is a protected park area located in Harrison Township, Harrison County, Indiana.  The site preserves the battlefield where a portion of the Battle of Corydon occurred on July 9, 1863.   It is part of the Harrison County Parks Department and is officially known as the Battle of Corydon Memorial Park. It contains the Corydon Civil War Museum.

The site was added to the National Register of Historic Places on July 9, 1979.

Gallery

References

External links
 Official site

Archaeological sites on the National Register of Historic Places in Indiana
National Register of Historic Places in Harrison County, Indiana
Corydon, Indiana
Parks in Indiana
Protected areas of Harrison County, Indiana
Conflict sites on the National Register of Historic Places in Indiana
American Civil War on the National Register of Historic Places
American Civil War museums